The Ministry of Administration and Digitization was formed on 21 November 2011, from a reorganisation of the Ministry of Infrastructure and the Ministry of Interior and Administration.

The Ministry was disbanded on 16 November 2015 based on the regulation of the Council of Ministers, and partially superseded by the Ministry of Digital Affairs.

The ministry was concerned with various aspects of administration, Internet and telecommunication in Poland.

The last minister was Andrzej Halicki.

The Ministry used to oversee:
 the Office of Electronic Communication (Urząd Komunikacji Elektronicznej)
 Chief Country Geodesist (Główny Geodeta Kraju)

Ministers (2011–2015)

External links
 Official website of Ministry of Administration and Digitization

2011 establishments in Poland
Administration and Digitization
Poland, Administration and Digitization
Poland
2015 disestablishments in Poland
Regulation in Poland